Miriah Meyer is an American computer scientist and USTAR professor at the University of Utah. She is noted for her pioneering work in data visualization for research applications. She received an American Association for the Advancement of Science Mass Media Science & Engineering Fellowship in 2006 and served as a reporter for The Chicago Tribune. She was named in MIT Technology Reviews TR35 list in 2011 and Fast Company's list of the 100 most creative people in 2012. She was named a 2013 TED Fellow for her work in interactive visualization.

References

Living people
Pennsylvania State University alumni
University of Utah alumni
American computer scientists
American women computer scientists
University of Utah faculty
Computer graphics researchers
Information visualization experts
Year of birth missing (living people)
American women academics
21st-century American women
TED Fellows